J. Clarke may refer to:
Ghetts, Justin Clarke, a british rapper and songwriter (born 9 October 1984) 
J. Clarke (Leicestershire cricketer)
Jay Clarke (tennis), a British tennis player (born 27 July 1998)
Jean Clarke, a former US tennis player – see 1956 Wimbledon Championships – Women's Singles